Rupsa Junction railway station is a railway station on the South Eastern Railway network in the state of Odisha, India. It serves Rupsa town. Its code is ROP. It has five platforms. Passenger, Express and Superfast trains halt at Rupsa Junction railway station.

Major trains

 Sri Jagannath Express
 East Coast Express
 Simlipal Intercity Express
 Bangriposi–Bhubaneswar Superfast Express

See also
 Balasore District

References

Railway stations in Balasore district
Kharagpur railway division